Messaging Application Programming Interface (MAPI) is an API for Microsoft Windows which allows programs to become email-aware. While MAPI is designed to be independent of the protocol, it is usually used to communicate with Microsoft Exchange Server.

Details 
MAPI uses functions loosely based on the X.400 XAPIA standard.  It includes facilities to access message transports, message stores, and directories.

While Simple MAPI (SMAPI) is a subset of 12 functions which enable developers to add basic messaging functionality, Extended MAPI (EMAPI) allows complete control over the messaging system on the client computer. This includes creation and management of messages, plus management of the client mailbox, and service providers. 

Simple MAPI is included with Microsoft Windows as part of Outlook Express/Windows Mail while the full Extended MAPI is included with Microsoft Outlook and Exchange.

In addition to the Extended MAPI client interface, programming calls can be made indirectly through the Simple MAPI API client interface, through the Common Messaging Calls (CMC) API client interface, or by the object-based CDO Library interface.  These three methods are easier to use and designed for less complex messaging-enabled and -aware applications. (Simple MAPI and CMC were removed from Exchange 2003.)

MAPI was originally designed by Microsoft.  The company founded its MS Mail team in 1987, but it was not until it acquired Consumers Software in 1991 to obtain Network Courier that it had a messaging product. Reworked, it was sold as MS PC Mail (or Microsoft Mail for PC Networking).  The basic API to MS PC Mail was later known as MAPI version 0 (or MAPI0), to differentiate it from "true" MAPI.

Service provider interface 
The full Extended MAPI interface is required for interfacing messaging-based services to client applications such as Outlook. For example, several non-Microsoft e-mail server product vendors created "MAPI service providers" to allow their products to be accessed via Outlook. Notable examples include Axigen Mail Server, Kerio Connect, Scalix, Zimbra, HP OpenMail, IBM Lotus Notes, Zarafa/Kopano, and Bynari.

MAPI also had a service provider interface of sorts.  Microsoft used this to interface MS Mail to an email system based on Xenix, for internal use.

Extended MAPI is the main e-mail data access method used by Outlook, to interface to Microsoft Exchange, via MAPI service providers shipped with Outlook.

MAPI/RPC protocol details 
Microsoft has released full details of the MAPI/RPC protocol since August 2007.

"MAPI protocol" is a colloquial name for the MAPI/RPC.  At times, Microsoft has also called it "Exchange RPC" and "Outlook-Exchange Transport Protocol".

Microsoft provides a sample MAPI/RPC-based application called MFCMAPI to assist developers. It is also widely used as a diagnostics tool by both developers and Microsoft Exchange administrators.

MAPI over HTTP
The original implementation was designed for use on a local network, or LAN.

With Exchange 2003 Microsoft introduced RPC over HTTP (later renamed Outlook Anywhere) as a way to Exchange over the internet.

In 2014 with Exchange 2013 SP1 replaced this with a more 'normal' HTTP-based stack known as "MAPI over HTTP".

Reimplementations 
Several open-source software projects have started working on implementing MAPI libraries, including:

 The OpenMapi project (now demised) had a C# implementation.
 Kopano (software) Groupware Core has a C++2011 implementation called "mapi4linux" (continuation of the same from Zarafa), which offers an API that is source-backwards-compatible with the Messaging API (code written for M4L also build with the Windows SDK). Kopano GWC comes with a connector for the Zarafa/Kopano-based SOAP/HTTP transport.
 OpenChange has a "libmapi" component written in C that only partially resembles MAPI. (Lacks interfaces like IMsgStore, the OpenEntry function.)
 The OpenChange subproject Evolution-MAPI is a connector for Exchange implementing the MAPI/RPC transport.
 The Gnome Evolution project develops evolution-ews, which has implemented much of MAPI.

References

External links 
Messaging API at MSDN Library
OpenChange project - details of MAPI protocol and tools for exploring MAPI protocol
OpenMapi project - Open Source, multi-language MAPI implementation which can connect to other groupware sources, with API documentation
Messaging API Archived User Forum
Enabling Outlook Connector logging for support

Internet mail protocols
Microsoft application programming interfaces